Scrobipalpa extensa is a moth in the family Gelechiidae. It was described by Povolný in 1969. It is found in Afghanistan.

The forewings are covered by mixed light brownish and darkened scales. The hindwings are grey.

References

Scrobipalpa
Moths described in 1969
Taxa named by Dalibor Povolný